Mohammad-Hossein Moghimi is an Iranian politician who was former  Governor of Tehran Province.

Electoral history

References

1950 births
Living people
Iranian Vice Ministers
Iranian governors
Members of the 8th Islamic Consultative Assembly
Executives of Construction Party politicians
People from Markazi Province